PAF (Pakistan Air Force) Base Malir is a non-flying Pakistan Air Force Base. The Malir base was originally built by British during the World War II as the last line of defense against the Wehrmacht. After the war, it was used as the processing area for the returning American soldiers. After being abandoned, Malir was again brought to use to train the technicians working in the domain of radio and radar for Pakistan Air Force and was upgraded to a station status in 1949.

In current times, the base plays the role of maintaining the lodger units prepared for any wartime situations. Malir base was reported to efficiently provide support during Indo-Pakistani War of 1965 and Indo-Pakistani War of 1971 wars with India.

References 

Pakistan Air Force bases